"U.S.A. (Aiight Then)" is the third and final single from Mobb Deep's Murda Muzik album. The b-side features the song "Spread Love". The song was originally titled "Street Kingz" and featured a short verse by fellow rapper Nas.

Track listing
Side A
"U.S.A. (Aiight Then)" [Clean Version]
"U.S.A. (Aiight Then)" [Dirty Version]
"U.S.A. (Aiight Then)" [Instrumental]

Side B
"Spread Love" [Clean Version]
"Spread Love" [Dirty Version]
"Spread Love" [Instrumental]

Charts

2000 songs
Mobb Deep songs
Loud Records singles
Songs written by Prodigy (rapper)
Songs written by Havoc (musician)